Dreamer is a 1979 American sports film directed by Noel Nosseck, written by Larry Bischof and James Proctor, and starring Tim Matheson, Susan Blakely and Jack Warden. It was released theatrically on April 27, 1979, and was released by 20th Century Fox through Magnetic Video on home video.

Story
A young man dreams and struggles to become a championship bowler, knowing that determination and sacrifice must come first.

Tim Matheson is the Dreamer in this story which many saw as heavily inspired by Rocky. "Dreamer" is a ten-pin whiz in his small town of Alton, Illinois, but wants to make it in the big time on the professional tour.  Ultimately, he does, with the help of irascible manager Harry (Jack Warden) and faithful girlfriend Karen (Susan Blakely). As if to underline the resemblances between Dreamer and its cinematic role model, the musical score is by Rocky'''s Bill Conti.

Bowling legend Dick Weber appears at the movie's beginning and end as Johnny Watkin.

Cast
 Tim Matheson as Harold "Dreamer" Nuttingham
 Susan Blakely as Karen Lee
 Jack Warden as Harry White
 Richard B. Shull as George Taylor
 Barbara Stuart as Angie
 Owen Bush as The Fan
 John Crawford as Riverboat Captain
 Marya Small as Elaine 
 Matt Clark as Spider
 Morgan Farley as Old Timer
 Pedro Gonzalez Gonzalez as Too
 Speedy Zapata as Juan
 JoBe Cerny as Ralph Patterson
 Azizi Johari as Lady
 Dick Weber as Johnny Watkin
 Chris Schenkel as himself
 Nelson Burton Jr. as Color Man
 Julian Byrd as Red Harper
 Rita Ascot Boyd as Grandma

Production
Producer Mike Lobell felt there would be an audience for a film about ten pin bowling, considering the popularity of the sport. He raised finance from 20th Century Fox.

Tim Matheson had not bowled since the age of 10 when he got the starring role. To prepare for his part he spent four to six hours a day for two weeks bowling with Dick Weber's son Rich and also studied videotapes of top bowlers such as Mark Roth, Earl Anthony and Marshall Holman.

Principal photography took place in Alton, Illinois and St. Louis from July 31 to September 12, 1978.

The picture's production budget was reported at $2.9 million plus $3.54 million for marketing.

Reception
Janet Maslin of The New York Times stated, "I'm not sure I've ever seen a movie that was supposed to tell a story and managed to be as uneventful as 'Dreamer'."

Roger Ebert gave the film 1.5 stars out of 4 and wrote, "There could no doubt be a good movie made about bowling or about the human elements in any professional sport. But 'Dreamer' doesn't even try to do that. It just takes a routine old formula, one that could apply as well (or as badly) to any sport from soccer to wrestling, and plugs in bowling as the subject matter."

Gene Siskel of the Chicago Tribune also awarded 1.5 stars out of 4 and called it "hopelessly predictable."Variety wrote, "Shamelessly attempting to be a 'Rocky' of the bowling world, 'Dreamer' is a preposterous, colorless down-home fantasy about a youth who makes the jump from unknown bushleaguer to national champion in three easy lessons."

Kevin Thomas of the Los Angeles Times declared the film "a nice little movie" and "a pleasant piece of Midwestern Americana, refreshing in its lack of gratuitous sex and gore but also likely to be too mild for some tastes." Gary Arnold of The Washington Post'' called it "a pleasant, inconsequential sports melodrama."

References

External links
 

1979 films
Films set in Illinois
Ten-pin bowling films
Films scored by Bill Conti
Films shot in Illinois
1970s sports drama films
Films shot in Missouri
20th Century Fox films
American sports drama films
1979 drama films
1970s English-language films
Films directed by Noel Nosseck
1970s American films